Hua Yu may refer to:

Standard Chinese, known as "Hua Yu" in parts of Southeast Asia
Yu Hua (born 1960), Chinese writer
Yu Hua (rower) (born 1981), Chinese rower

See also
Huayu (disambiguation)